The 2010–11 WICB Cup was the 37th domestic List A cricket tournament held in the West Indies, it took place from 14 October 2010 – 24 October 2010. The eight teams were divided into two groups with the top two from each group advancing to the semi-finals. Barbados and the Leeward Islands shared the title after the final match ended in a tie.

Wilden Cornwall of the Leeward Islands was the tournament's top run-scorer with 188. The highest wicket-taker was the Barbados player Ryan Hinds who took 14.

Group stage

Group A

Group B

Semi-finals

Final

References

WICB Cup
Regional Super50 seasons
2010–11 West Indian cricket season